The 131st district of the Texas House of Representatives contains a portion of Harris county. The current Representative is Alma Allen, who was first elected in 2004.

References 

131